Megan Burns (born 25 June 1986), also known as Betty Curse, is an English musician and actress.

Early life and acting career
Burns was born in Liverpool, England. When Burns was 11 her grandmother sent her to acting classes. From there she received a part in the film Liam (2000). She won the Marcello Mastroianni Award at the Venice Film Festival for her performance. Danny Boyle saw this and cast her in his film 28 Days Later, where she played Hannah, one of the survivors of a deadly epidemic.
Megan was cast in the film In2ruders, directed by Naeem Mahmood, also starring Tony Hadley and Caprice Bourret.

Singing career
Burns has since worked as a singer under the pseudonym Betty Curse. Her first single release was a double A-side, "Met on the Internet" and "Excuse All the Blood", released 29 May 2006. Her first album Hear Lies was released on 31 October 2006 via iTunes.

The CD version, Here Lies Betty Curse, was released in April 2007. The album's first single, "God This Hurts", was released in August 2007, shortly followed by "Girl with Yellow Hair" on 13 November. In 2006 she performed and won on a Halloween special of the children's television programme The Slammer with "Girl With Yellow Hair".

Filmography

Film

Discography

Albums
2006 Hear Lies — release 30 October (download only)
2006 Here Lies Betty Curse

Singles
2006 "Excuse All the Blood"
2006 "God This Hurts" UK No.116
2006 "Girl with Yellow Hair" UK No.132
2007 "Do You Mind (If I Cry)"

References

External links

Betty Curse interview at musicOMH.com
Betty Curse (Band) on Myspace
Betty Curse "Megan Burns" on Myspace

1986 births
Living people
English film actresses
Women rock singers
Musicians from Liverpool
Actresses from Liverpool
21st-century English actresses
21st-century English women singers
21st-century English singers
English pop rock singers
Marcello Mastroianni Award winners